Jesper Olofsson (born November 26, 1993) is a Swedish professional ice hockey player currently playing with the EHC Biel of the National League (NL). He is the older brother of Buffalo Sabres left winger Victor Olofsson.

Playing career
A native of Örnsköldsvik, Olofsson played in the youth system of Modo Hockey and made his debut for the club's men's team in the SHL during the 2010–11 Elitserien season. After spending the 2012–13 campaign with the Odense Bulldogs in Denmark, he returned to his native Sweden, joining second-division team Almtuna IS for the 2013–14 season. After one year, Olofsson moved on to another Allsvenskan outfit, BIK Karlskoga. In 2015, he was picked up by Karlskrona HK of the SHL. He saw the ice in 57 games during the 2015–16 season, scoring 13 goals, while assisting on 16 more.

In April 2016, he signed with fellow SHL side Skellefteå AIK. He played two years with SAIK, leaving following the 2017–18 season, to sign a two-year contract with his fourth SHL club, Färjestad BK, on 27 April 2018.

He left Färjestad in May 2020 to pursue opportunities in the National Hockey League. On May 20, 2020, Olofsson agreed to join his brother Victor within the Buffalo Sabres organization, signing a one-year AHL contract with affiliate, the Rochester Americans. With the 2020–21 North American season delayed due the COVID-19 pandemic, Olofsson opted to remain in Europe, signing for the remainder of the Swiss NL campaign with SC Bern on 23 December 2020.

On April 29, 2021, Olofsson joined the SCL Tigers on a one-year deal for the 2021–22 season. Olofsson enjoyed a productive season with the Tigers, amassing 25 goals and 50 points in 43 regular season games. With the SCL Tigers missing out on the playoffs, Olofsson was earlier signed in the midst of the season to a two-year contract with EHC Biel on 24 December 2021.

Career statistics

References

External links

1993 births
Almtuna IS players
SC Bern players
EHC Biel players
IF Björklöven players
IK Oskarshamn players
Färjestad BK players
Karlskrona HK players
Living people
Modo Hockey players
Odense Bulldogs players
SCL Tigers players
Skellefteå AIK players
Swedish ice hockey left wingers
People from Örnsköldsvik Municipality
Sportspeople from Västernorrland County